The Boßler Tunnel is a railway tunnel currently under construction as part of the new Wendlingen–Ulm high-speed railway. The tunnel runs between Aichelberg and Mühlhausen im Täle under the Roter Wasen and the Boßler mountain. It is one of a series of tunnels underneath the Swabian Jura range. When completed, it will be the longest tunnel on the line and the fifth longest tunnel in Germany (after the Landrücken Tunnel, the Münden Tunnel, the Filder Tunnel and the Katzenberg Tunnel).

Route 

The north-west portal (portal Aichelberg, track location marker 39.720 km), situated northeast of Weilheim an der Teck, is the border of one of the line's planning sections.  The line approaches this portal from the west, parallel to the A8 motorway.

The tunnel runs in a straight line towards the southeast, passing under the Roter Wasen and the Boßler.

The south-east portal (portal Buch im Filstal, 48.076 km) is situated between Mühlhausen im Täle and Wiesensteig. The line exits the portal onto the  Fils Viaduct across the A8.

History

Deciding between alternative routes 
The tunnel is part of the Albaufstieg section of the line (track section 2.2), which involves an ascent of the Swabian Jura (also known in German as the Alb).  25 alternative routes were initially considered for this section. A plan drawn up in 1993 included an  tunnel. A later, 1995 plan included an  tunnel.
Many alternative routes were considered for the Aichelberg to Widderstall corridor. As well as routes involving a combined rail and motorway tunnel and a direct route, local variations of the route in the Neidlingen, Wiesensteig and Westerheim districts were also considered.

The spatial planning provisions required to consider possible alternative routes for the Albaufstieg. Eight different routes were examined in detail. In 1999 a hydrological evaluation of these variants was conducted. After a planning stop in 2000, a new integrated assessment was carried out in 2006 in the context of paths for combined traffic routes.
In the middle of 1991 an early road design proposed the beginning of the tunnel already in Weilheim an der Teck. while a length of 9 km was allotted for this part of Albaufstieg. According to the planning status of 1993, an 8.8 km long tunnel was provided in this area.

As of 2004  and 2007, the planned length was 8710 m. Plans of 2007 envisaged the building of an exploratory tunnel within the cross-section of the later final tunnel due to the prevalent geological conditions.

In mid-August 2009, the consultation process for the 14.5 km long zoning section Albaufstieg to which the tunnel belongs, was completed by the regional council of Stuttgart and handed over to the Federal Railway Authority for final approval. In the process leading to approval, 82 public agencies were consulted, and 1150 private reservations were handled. The principal resulting changes affected the site logistics. In mid-2009, construction work was scheduled to start in 2010.

Dispute on use of tunnel boring machines 
Due to the unstable rock, planning decisions initially ruled out the use of tunnel boring machines. However, according to entrepreneur Martin Herrenknecht their use could save 70 to 100 million euros over the originally tendered conventional method The company obtained expert opinion at their own cost, and thus achieved the approval of mechanical tunneling. Together with the excavation of Filder tunnel, 80 to 100 million euros could thus been saved. A 2830 m long section was advanced using tunnel boring machines (TBM) in both tubes. Although Deutsche Bahn had stipulated conventional shotcrete tunneling in the tender documents, alternative proposals for TBM excavation were welcomed. This proved an economic solution.

Award of contract 
On 8 November 2011, the tunnel shell of Boßler- and Steinbühltunnel was put out for tender in Europe. The Boßlertunnel construction was subdivided into two lots of approximately 3670 m and approximately 5100 m in length; the Steinbühltunnel forms a third, independent lot. The contract also involved around 1.32 million cubic meters of excavated material or to be used during the project or disposed of, and the construction of four temporary connection points on the Autobahn 8

The calculation documents were sent to bidders in February 2012.
The contract was awarded in October 2012, together with the Steinbühltunnel construct. The cost for both tunnels came to 635 million euros, believed to be significantly below the planned cost  
Originally, the award was not expected to be made until the end of 2010 (Status: December 2011). The award was officially published at the end of November 2012.[26]
The total cost for both the tunnel Albaufstiegs specified end of October 2013, about 1.05 billion euros.   For the full planning approval section 2.4, the price was estimated at EUR 1,074.3 million.
When the financing agreement for the new line was concluded in April 2009, the Boßler Tunnel was estimated to have shell costs of around EUR 19.5 million per kilometer and tube. When applying for the financial construction permit in 2010, the planned cost was  EUR 32.0 million per kilometer and tube.

Construction 

The clearing work for the construction side began in early December 2012. In 2013, an embankment was added between the existing bridge over the L1214 road and the future tunnel portal. The bridge was completed the first building of the new line in 2011 
In early 2012, following the Site survey the advance was scheduled for mid-2013  The excavation at 'intermediate attack Umpfental' 'began in July 2013.
66 months are provided for the shell. The two tubes should be first built using the NATM. To accelerate the construction, three intermediate points were provided. As part of a plan amendment process in 2008 an intermediate advance was rejected. The planning of 2009 envisaged another intermediate advance in the form of a preliminary window tunnel, to be filled in after completion of the tunneling. The machine advance from the western portal was over a length of 2830 m. An advance from the eastern portal was not undertaken, due to the very steep flanks and environmental considerations. By mid-November 2014, 600 meters of intermediate advance had been completed.

Of the 8,772 m long west tube, 8,745 m are being advanced in traditional drill & blast methods; portal structures are planned for the remaining 27 m. Of the 8,788 m long east tunnel, 8,761 m are being advanced using traditional drill & blast methods and 27. m using cut and cover for the portals. Together with the Steinbühltunnel, a total of 4.3 million cubic meters of material will be excavated. The machine advance should, according to the planning status of the end of 2013, begin not later than 21 September 2014.[well, did it?]

Approximately 8,000 people attended a Construction Site Open Day on 8 November 2014. Machine advance began symbolically. The actual machine advance was scheduled to begin in January 2015.

After the overburden proved more solid than initially planned, in 2014, an extended machine advance was considered. Could machine advance be used?  Spätestens am 8. Dezember 2014 wurde der konventionelle Vortrieb ohne Angabe von Gründen gestoppt. Dabei waren bergabwärts 731 m und bergaufwärts bei 47 m. It was downhill 731 m and uphill at 47 m  The according to other sources for before Christmas in 2014  announced propelling start was delayed, according to web information indefinitely due to necessary fine adjustments to the machine 

At the end of February 2015, the Federal Railway announced its intention to extend the machine advance In early March 2015, talks were held between German railway and contractors on the extension of mechanical tunneling  Due in part to lack of permits, the start of driving was delayed four months in total

The machine advance finally began on 14 April 2015. The 120 meter long, 11.38. m high  machine, worth 29 million euros, is called  S 833  and was given the name  Kätchen. It was planned advance by 15 to 20 meters per day. The machine advance would take eight to nine months in the first tunnel tube. After one kilometer of machines advance, very dry rock dust was unexpectedly encountered. Instead of the planned 20 meters per day, the machine advanced achieved as much as 30 meters. In July and August 2015, the advance was paused for five weeks in order to convert the logistics for a higher driving speed. On 5 August 2015 the advance was resumed  early September 2015 were with the machine 1.6 propelled km 

The segments for the outer skin of the tunnel were made in a segment plant in Weilheim, seven days a week, in two shifts per day with 100 workers each. They are transported the 1.6 km  to the tunnel portal with a Feldbahn.

On 6 November 2016 the machine finished the first tunnel.
The structural work was done from 2013–2018. The tunnel is scheduled for completion in November 2019.

Geology 
For about six kilometres, the tunnel passes beneath Middle Jurassic layers. Preliminary investigations had shown very low strength in some sections, thus unstable rock is expected in connection with an overburden of up to 280 m. Furthermore, Karst formations are expected in the White Jurassic layers. The Middle Jurassic layers consist of claystone and argillaceous marl with sandstone inclusions. From top to bottom, the layers α, β (unstable rock), and γ - ξ are traversed, followed by White Jurassic α, β, and γ.

References

External links 

 "The Stuttgart-Ulm Rail Project". DB Projekt Stuttgart–Ulm GmbH. Retrieved 29 September 2016.

High-speed railway lines in Germany
Railway tunnels in Germany